Fred Tilman (born June 21, 1945) is an American politician who served as a member of Idaho House of Representatives from 2002 to 2004. He later served as a member of the Ada County Board of Commissioners.

Early life and education 
Tilman was born in Caldwell, Idaho and attended Boise State University. Tilman served in the United States Army from 1965 to 1968.

Career

Idaho Republican Party 
Tilman defeated incumbent Greg Ferch in 2014 to become the Ada County Republican Party Chair.

Ada County commissioner 
Tilman resigned 5/16/2003 from the Idaho House of Representatives to be appointed to the Ada County Board of Commissioners. He served till 2010 where he lost in the Republican primary.

Elections

Idaho House of Representatives 22 Seat B

2012 
Tilman took second losing to Jason Monks in the Republican primary taking only 20.6% of the vote; Michael Law, and Stephen Warren also ran.

Ada County Commissioner

2010 
Tilman lost to Vern Bisterfeldt, a Boise City Council member in the Republican primary election losing by 738 votes.

Idaho House of Representatives 21 Seat B

2002 
Tilman defeated Cliff Bayer in the Republican primary with 60% of the vote. Tilman defeated Democratic nominee James D. (Jay) Gooden and Libertarian nominee Teddi Hyde with 65.4% of the vote in the general election.

Idaho House of Representatives 18 Seat B

2000 
Tilman was unopposed in the Republican primary. Tilman defeated Democratic nominee James D. Gooden Jr. with 71.5% of the vote in the general election.

1998 
Tilman was unopposed in the Republican primary and the general election.

1996 
Tilman was unopposed in the Republican primary. Tilman was unopposed in the general election due to the Democratic nominee Robert M. Chase dropped out.

1994 
Tilman was unopposed in the Republican primary and general election.

1992 
Tilman was unopposed in the Republican primary. Tilman defeated Democratic nominee H.Y. "Skip" Nakashima.

1990 
Tilman defeated John L. Osier in the Republican primary. Tilman defeated Democratic nominee Linda Cope.

Personal life 
Tilman's wife is Geri Tilman. They have one child. Tilman and his family live in Boise, Idaho.

References

External links 
 Fred Tilman at ballotpedia.org

1945 births
Living people
Republican Party members of the Idaho House of Representatives
People from Boise, Idaho
People from Caldwell, Idaho
21st-century American politicians